Bolshaya Gorka is a rural locality (a village) in Gorodishchenskoye Rural Settlement, Nyuksensky District, Vologda Oblast, Russia. The population was 19 as of 2002.

Geography 
Bolshaya Gorka is located 57 km southwest of Nyuksenitsa (the district's administrative centre) by road. Kostinskaya is the nearest rural locality.

References 

Rural localities in Nyuksensky District